Garden Acres may refer to:

Garden Acres, California
Garden Acres, Indiana
Garden Acres, Texas